Kirgody is a rural locality (a village) in Kameshnikovskoye Rural Settlement, Sheksninsky District, Vologda Oblast, Russia. The population was 93 as of 2002.

Geography 
Kirgody is located 57 km north of Sheksna (the district's administrative centre) by road. Kameshnik is the nearest rural locality.

References 

Rural localities in Sheksninsky District